The 5th Corps is a field corps of the Turkish Army under 1st Army. It is headquartered at Çorlu in Tekirdağ Province under command of Tevfik Algan. It was formed in 1921 during the Turkish War of Independence.

Subunits 

 1st Armored Brigade
 3rd Armored Brigade
 54th Mechanized Infantry Brigade
 55th Mechanized Infantry Brigade
 65th Mechanized Infantry Brigade
 Corps Armored Cavalry Battalion
 105th Artillery Regiment

References 

Corps of Turkey